Nayarah, alternatively spelled Niyarah, is a village in northern Aleppo Governorate, northwestern Syria.

The village administratively belongs to Nahiya Azaz in Azaz District. Nearby localities include al-Salameh  to the west and Tatiyah  to the north. In the 2004 census, Nayarah had a population of 1,337. 

During the Roman Empire  Nayarah/Nijar was a civitas of the Roman Province of Syria, known as Niara.

Demographics
In late 19th century, traveler Martin Hartmann noted Nayarah as a Turkish village of 15 households, then located in the Ottoman nahiyah of Azaz-i Turkman.

References

Roman towns and cities in Syria
Turkmen communities in Syria